Francis Shaw may refer to:

 Francis Shaw (historian), see Pádraig Ó Snodaigh
 Francis Shaw (footballer), Scottish footballer
 Francis Shaw (composer), see MovieScore Media

See also
 Frankie Shaw, American actress
 Frank Shaw (disambiguation)
 Frances Shaw (disambiguation)